Christina Singer-Bath (born 27 July 1968) is a retired tennis player from Germany. She competed at Wimbledon several times from 1987 to 1999.

WTA Tour finals

Doubles (0–1)

ITF Finals

Singles (5–1)

Doubles (3–1)

References

External links
 
 
 

1968 births
Living people
German female tennis players
West German female tennis players
People from Göppingen
Sportspeople from Stuttgart (region)
Tennis people from Baden-Württemberg